Lightening holes are holes in structural components of machines and buildings used by a variety of engineering disciplines to make structures lighter. The edges of the hole may be flanged to increase the rigidity and strength of the component. The holes can be circular, triangular, elliptical, or rectangular and should have rounded edges, but they should never have sharp corners, to avoid the risk of stress risers, and they must not be too close to the edge of a structural component.

Usage

Aviation

Lightening holes are often used in the aviation industry. This allows the aircraft to be lightweight as possible, retaining the durability and airworthiness of the aircraft structure.

Maritime
Lightening holes have also been used in marine engineering to increase seaworthiness of the vessel.

Motorsports

Lightening holes became a prominent feature of motor racing in the 1920s and 1930s. Chassis members, suspension components, engine housings and even connecting rods were drilled with a range of holes, of sizes almost as large as the component.

Military
Lightening holes have been used in various military vehicles, aircraft, equipment and weaponry platforms. This allows equipment to be lighter in weight as well as increase the ruggedness and durability. They are usually made by drilling holes, pressed stamping or machining and can also save strategic materials and cost during wartime production.

Architecture

Lightening holes have been used on various architecture designs. During the 1980s and early 1990s, lightening holes were fashionable and somewhat seen as futuristic and were used in the likes of industrial units, car showrooms, shopping precincts, sports centres etc. Parsons House in London is a notable building that uses lightening holes since its renovation in 1988. Ringwood Health & Leisure Centre in Hampshire is another notable example.

See also
 Honeycomb structure
 Hollow structural section
 Isogrid
 Truss

References

External links

 Tests Of Beams Having Webs With Large Circular Lightening Holes, by L. Ross Levin, National Advisory Committee for Aeronautics
 The Strength And Stiffness Of Shear Webs With And Without Lightening Holes, by Paul Kuhn, National Advisory Committee for Aeronautics
 The Strength And Stiffness Of Shear Webs With Round Lightening Holes Having 45° Flanges, by Paul Kuhn, National Advisory Committee for Aeronautics

Mechanical engineering
Civil engineering
Structural engineering
Aerospace engineering
Marine engineering
Military engineering